Jamie Smith (born 25 December 1997) is an English professional footballer who currently plays as a defender for Greenville Triumph in the USL League One.

Career

Early career
Smith attended St Francis of Assisi Catholic College, and joined the Walsall academy at the age of 12, playing for the Walsall youth team as a two-year scholar, before being released by the club in 2016. He subsequently signed with National League side Sutton United, making a single league appearance before joining Ryman League Premier Division club Hendon on loan.

College
In 2017, Smith moved to the United States to play college soccer at Limestone University in South Carolina. Here he played two seasons for the Saints, making 37 appearances, scoring five goals and tallying two assists. While at Limestone, Smith was awarded multiple accolades including 2018 Conference Carolinas All-Tournament Team, Second-Team All-Conference Carolinas, Second-Team D2CCA All-Southeast Regio, and First-Team All-Conference Carolinas.

Smith transferred to North Carolina State University in 2019, going on to make 46 appearances with the Wolfpack, scoring five goals, and was named to the ACC Academic Honor Roll on consecutive seasons.

While at college, Smith played for amateur side Asheville City SC, appearing for the club in the NPSL during their 2018 and 2019 seasons, making 21 appearances and scoring a three goals. across both seasons. He didn't appear for the team in 2020 due to the season been cancelled due to the COVID-19 pandemic. He continued with Asheville as they moved to play in the USL League Two, making twelve regular season appearances.

Greenville Triumph
On 16 March 2022, Smith signed with USL League One club Greenville Triumph after a month-long trial. He made his debut for the team on 2 April 2022, starting in a 2–0 loss to Central Valley Fuego.

Personal life
Smith is the son of Dean Smith, who was a former professional footballer and now head coach.

References

External links
 

1997 births
Living people
Association football defenders
English expatriate footballers
English expatriate sportspeople in the United States
English footballers
Expatriate soccer players in the United States
Greenville Triumph SC players
Hendon F.C. players
Isthmian League players
Limestone Saints men's soccer players
National League (English football) players
National Premier Soccer League players
NC State Wolfpack men's soccer players
Sutton United F.C. players
USL League One players
USL League Two players
Walsall F.C. players